Three Loves in Rio is a 1959 Brazilian-Argentine drama film directed by Carlos Hugo Christensen. It was entered into the 9th Berlin International Film Festival.

Cast
 Susana Freyre
 Jardel Filho
 Domingo Alzugaray
 Fábio Cardoso
 Agildo Ribeiro
 Diana Morel
 Dina Lisboa
 Humberto Catalano
 Afonso Stuart
 Blanca Tapia
 Vicente Rubino
 Carlos Infante
 Marga de los Llanos
 Orlando Guy
 Antonio Ventura
 Antonio Camargo

References

External links 
 

1959 films
1950s Portuguese-language films
1950s Spanish-language films
1959 comedy films
Films directed by Carlos Hugo Christensen
Films shot in Rio de Janeiro (city)
1950s multilingual films
Brazilian multilingual films
Argentine multilingual films
1950s Argentine films